The Team Envy Overwatch team represented Team Envy, an American esports franchise, in the video game Overwatch. Originally competing under the name Team EnVyUs, the team won multiple regional and international competitions before being transferred to the Dallas Fuel franchise of the Overwatch League (OWL) by their parent organization, Envy Gaming. The franchise reestablished its Overwatch division in 2018 and currently competes in the North America West region of Overwatch Contenders (OWC) as an academy team for the Dallas Fuel. The division disbanded in April 2020.

Franchise history

2016–2017: Pre-Overwatch League 

Formed during the Overwatch closed beta in February 2016, Team EnVyUs acquired the players of Team Hubris, a North American squad that finished first in six of the seven tournaments played during the beta, to officially create their Overwatch esports division. Even though their original roster showed some early promise in online tournaments, just prior to the official launch of Overwatch, the team disbanded. A week later, EnVyUs formed a roster by looking abroad, eventually bringing players from across Europe to their Charlotte headquarters and securing the core of what would become the Dallas Fuel in Sebastian "chipshajen" Widlund, Christian "cocco" Jonsson, Jonathan "HarryHook" Tejedor Rua, and Timo "Taimou" Kettunen.

Amassing a 57-game winning streak, the new roster showed why they were widely considered the best team in the world. However, their early dominance resulted in disappointing results, when, as heavy favorites, the team failed to win either of their first two LAN tournaments. It was not until the arrival of Pongphop "Mickie" Rattanasangchod as a stand-in that saw Team EnVyUs have their first taste of success, winning Season 1 of OGN's Overwatch APEX in Seoul, Korea, marking the first time that a Western-owned team had taken home an esports title on Korean soil. They soon followed it up with a victory on home soil, winning the Overwatch North American Invitational at MLG Vegas. With their back-to-back tournament wins, Team EnVyUs ended 2016 once again making their case for the title of best team in the world.

In January 2017, just prior to Season 2 of OGN's Overwatch APEX, it was announced that Kyle "KyKy" Sounder would try-out as coach for the team. However, even with the addition, Season 2 was met with disappointment after being eliminated in the second round of group stages. Hoping to improve in Season 3 and re-find their 2016 form, the team recruited Hwang "EFFECT" Hyeon; however, the tournament would also prove to be a let-down, after the team placed 4th. Returning home from Korea, Team EnVyUs ended their pre-Overwatch League journey on a high, going undefeated and winning Season 1 of North America's Overwatch Contenders. The tournament's playoffs marked both the debut of Brandon "Seagull" Larned, as well as the final event played under the "Team EnVyUs" moniker.

On September 20, 2017, Blizzard officially announced that Envy Gaming had acquired the Dallas-based Overwatch League franchise spot, making them one of twelve teams competing in the inaugural season. The team was branded as the Dallas Fuel, and all of the existing members of Team EnVyUs were transferred to the Fuel roster – ending Team Envy's Overwatch division.

2018–2020: Rejoining Contenders 
On July 2, 2018, the Envy Gaming formally announced Team Envy's return to Overwatch Contenders as an academy team for the Dallas Fuel, as the team acquired EnVision Esports' Contenders slot and roster and signed former Team EnVyUs member Ronnie "Talespin" DuPree. The team rejoined Contenders in season two of 2018, where they finished the North American group stages with a 4–1 and qualified for the playoffs. After a close victory against Last Night's Leftovers in the quarterfinals, Envy was swept by Philadelphia Fusion's academy team Fusion University in the semifinals. The following season, Envy again qualified for the North American playoffs but fell to Fusion University in the quarterfinals.

In 2019 Season 1 of Contenders, Team Envy posted a perfect 7–0 record in the group stages to claim the top seed in the North American West region. The team cruised through the regional playoffs, defeating NRG Esports in the semifinals and ATL Academy in the finals by a combined map record of 7–1 to claim their second Overwatch Contenders regional title. Following their regional title, Envy was one of three North American teams that qualified for the Atlantic Showdown, an interregional double-elimination tournament. In the tournament, Envy took down London Spitfire's academy team British Hurricane in the first round, but fell to Fusion University in their next match. Following, the team defeated Angry Titans to again face Fusion University in the finals. Fusion had been the only team to ever defeat Envy in a post-season matchup, and that title would not be taken away from them, as Envy lost the finals by a score of 0–4. Envy continued their dominance in 2019 Season 2 of Contenders, posting another perfect 7–0 record in the group stages. The team took out Second Wind in the NA West semifinals and defeated the New York Excelsior's academy team XL2 Academy in the finals to secure their third Contenders regional title. Due to their regional title, the team qualified as for The Gauntlet, an interregional, Contenders tournament. After advancing past the group stages, Envy was eliminated from the tournament after losing to XL2 Academy, 0–3, in their first match.

On April 27, 2020, Team Envy disbanded their Overwatch Contenders division.

Seasons overview

Overwatch Contenders

Other tournaments 
1st – OG Invitational
2nd – Overwatch Open
1st – Overwatch APEX Season 1
1st – Major League Gaming Vegas 2016
4th – Overwatch APEX Season 3

OWL buyouts and promotions 
All Overwatch Contenders players are eligible to be promoted by their affiliated Overwatch League team or signed to any other Overwatch League during specified non-blackout periods.

2019 
Tank Caleb "McGravy" McGarvey was signed by Florida Mayhem on February 22.
Tank Ashley "Trill" Powell was promoted to the Dallas Fuel on May 7.
Tank Elliot "ELLIVOTE" Vaneryd and tank Lukas "LullSiSH" Wiklund were signed by Washington Justice on July 14.
DPS Jason "Jaru" White was signed by the Los Angeles Gladiators on December 12.

2020 
Support William "Crimzo" Hernandez was promoted to the Dallas Fuel on February 3.

OWL affiliates
Team Envy
 Dallas Fuel (2018–2020)

References 

 

Team Envy
Esports teams established in 2016
Esports teams based in the United States
Dallas Fuel
Defunct and inactive Overwatch League academy teams
Esports teams disestablished in 2020